Churintzio is a municipality in the Mexican state of Michoacán, located  northwest of the state capital of Morelia.

Geography
It borders the municipalities of Ecuandureo to the west, La Piedad to the north, Zináparo to the northeast, Penjamillo to the southeast, and Tlazazalca to the south.

Churintzio is located in the highlands of the Trans-Mexican Volcanic Belt. It is watered by intermittent streams and cold springs in the Lerma River basin.

Churintzio's climate is temperate with rain in the summer.

History
Churintzio was founded in 1543. The place name may derive from the Purépecha words achuri, "night", or chureni, "to grow dark". It became a municipality on 1 March 1904.

Administration
The municipal government comprises a president, a councillor (Spanish: síndico), and seven trustees (regidores), four elected by relative majority and three by proportional representation. The current president of the municipality is Juan Luis Contreras Calderón.

Demographics
In the 2010 Mexican Census, the municipality of Churintzio recorded a population of 5564 inhabitants living in 1654 households. The 2015 Intercensal Survey estimated a population of 5016 inhabitants in Churintzio.

There are 19 localities in the municipality, of which only the municipal seat, also known as Churintzio, is classified as urban. It recorded a population of 2592 inhabitants in the 2010 Census.

Economy and infrastructure
The main economic activities in Churintzio are agriculture and livestock production. A maquiladora manufactures clothes in the municipal seat. Federal Highway 15D traverses the municipality from east to west.

References

Municipalities of Michoacán
1904 establishments in Mexico
States and territories established in 1904